George Waldo State Park is an undeveloped public recreation area on the eastern shore of Lake Lillinonah in the town of Southbury, Connecticut. Park activities include hiking, mountain biking, horseback riding, fishing, and hunting. The state park is managed by the Connecticut Department of Energy and Environmental Protection.

References

External links
George Waldo State Park Connecticut Department of Energy and Environmental Protection
George Waldo State Park Map Connecticut Department of Energy and Environmental Protection

State parks of Connecticut
Parks in New Haven County, Connecticut
Southbury, Connecticut